Antônio Possamai S.D.B. (5 April 1929 – 27 October 2018) was a Brazilian Roman Catholic bishop.

Possamai was born in Brazil and was ordained to the priesthood in 1957. He served as bishop of the Roman Catholic Diocese of Ji-Paraná, Brazil, from 1983 to 2007.

Notes

1929 births
2018 deaths
20th-century Roman Catholic bishops in Brazil
Salesian bishops
21st-century Roman Catholic bishops in Brazil
People from Santa Catarina (state)
Roman Catholic bishops of Ji-Paraná